Éder Francis Carbonera (born 19 October 1983) is a Brazilian volleyball player for Taubaté. He was part of the Brazil men's national volleyball team at the 2014 FIVB Volleyball Men's World Championship and 2016 Summer Olympics. He played for Sada Cruzeiro Vôlei from 2013 to 2016. Carbonera In 2009, helped Brazil win the gold medal in the three competitions disputed, World League, Champions Cup and South American Championship.

Sporting achievements

Clubs
 2005/2006  Brazilian Superliga, with Cimed Florianópolis
 2007/2008  Brazilian Superliga, with Cimed Florianópolis
 2008/2009  Brazilian Superliga, with Cimed Florianópolis
 2009/2010  Brazilian Superliga, with Cimed Florianópolis
 2013/2014  Brazilian Superliga, with Sada Cruzeiro
 2014/2015  Brazilian Superliga, with Sada Cruzeiro
 2015/2016  Brazilian Superliga, with Sada Cruzeiro

South American Club Championship
  2009 – with Cimed Florianópolis
  2014 – with Sada Cruzeiro
  2016 – with Sada Cruzeiro

FIVB Club World Championship
  2013 – with Sada Cruzeiro
  2015 – with Sada Cruzeiro

Individual
 2006/07 Brazilian Superliga – Best Blocker
 2018/19 Brazilian Superliga – Best Middle Blocker

References

External links
 
 

1983 births
Living people
Brazilian men's volleyball players
Place of birth missing (living people)
Volleyball players at the 2011 Pan American Games
Pan American Games gold medalists for Brazil
Olympic volleyball players of Brazil
Volleyball players at the 2016 Summer Olympics
Medalists at the 2016 Summer Olympics
Olympic gold medalists for Brazil
Olympic medalists in volleyball
Pan American Games medalists in volleyball
Universiade medalists in volleyball
Universiade bronze medalists for Brazil
Medalists at the 2011 Summer Universiade
Medalists at the 2011 Pan American Games
Middle blockers